Patania verecunda is a moth in the family Crambidae. It was described by Warren in 1896. It is found in India (Khasia Hills).

References

Moths described in 1896
Spilomelinae